Kurt is a German-language masculine given name.

Kurt may also refer to:
Kurt (food), a Central Asian food
Yujiulü Mugulü, former of the Rouran Khaganate, also known as Kurt.
KURT (FM), a radio station (93.7 FM) licensed to serve Prineville, Oregon, United States
Kurt (surname), a Turkish (Kurt) or Hungarian (Kürt) surname
KutMasta Kurt, American hip-hop producer
Weather Station Kurt, Nazi WWII weather station in northern Labrador, Canada
 Moshulu, four-masted steel barque formerly named Kurt, docked in Penn's Landing, Philadelphia

See also

Curt
Kurd (disambiguation)